Elisabeth Freundlich (July 21, 1906 - January 25, 2001) was an Austrian Jewish playwright, poet, and journalist who reported on the Frankfurt Auschwitz Trials. She is a Holocaust survivor.

Life 
Elisabeth Freundlich was born in Vienna, Austria, the daughter of the Jewish social democratic lawyer Jacques Freundlich. She majored in German and Theater. After completing her degree, she worked as a playwright at the Neues Wiener Schauspielhaus.

Her father was banned from the legal profession and arrested by the Nazis in 1934. He has placed under house arrest. The family fled Nazi Germany in 1938. First, they went to Zurich. Later, they arrived in Paris where she founded the Federation of Austrian Emigrants in May 1938. In September 1938, she co-founded the League for Spiritual Austria.

In 1940, she emigrated to New York to work as a university lecturer. She studied librarianship at Columbia University. In 1943, she earned a permanent position at the Metropolitan Museum of Art. She oversaw Austro-American exhibits. She married the philosopher Günther Anders who had also gone into exile. They returned to Vienna in 1950. She was unable to sell her manuscripts. She began translating American literature and writing for newspapers for German newspapers inceding the Mannheimer Morgen. In the mid-1970s, she published an extensive poetic and journalistic work.

In 2009, the Elisabeth Freundlich Way in Vienna was named after her.

Works

Fiction 
 Der eherne Reiter (The Brazen Rider). Insel, Frankfurt 1982, .
 Der Seelenvogel (The Soul Bird). Zsolnay, Vienna 1986, .
 Finstere Zeiten (Dark Times). Persona, Mannheim 1986, .
 Die fahrenden Jahre (The Traveling Years). Memories. Edited and epilogue by Susanne Alge. Otto Müller, Salzburg 1992, .

Non-fiction 
 Sie wussten, was sie wollten: Lebensbilder bedeutender Frauen aus 3 Jahrhunderten (They knew what they wanted: portrayals of the lives of important women from 3 centuries). Herder, Freiburg 1981, .
 Die Ermordung einer Stadt namens Stanislau. NS-Vernichtungspolitik in Polen 1939–1945. (The murder of a city called Stanislau. Nazi extermination policy in Poland 1939–1945). Österreichischer Bundesverlag, Vienna 1986, . With afterwords by Susanne Alge and Yaroslav Hrytsak, re-edited by Paul Rosdy, Verlag der Theodor Kramer Gesellschaft, Vienna 2016, .

References

Further reading and related sources
Evelyn Adjunka: Die vierte Gemeinde. Die Wiener Juden in der Zeit von 1945 bis heute. (= Geschichte der Juden in Wien. 6). (The Viennese Jews from 1945 to the present day. (= History of the Jews in Vienna. 6)). Philo, Berlin 2000, ISBN 3-86572-163-X.
Erich Hackl: Die Namen der Dinge. Salut für Elisabeth Freundlic (The names of things. Salute to Elisabeth Freundlich). In: Literature and Criticism, H. 301/302, 2001, pp. 52–63 Susanne Blumesberger, Michael Doppelhofer, Gabriele Mauthe:
Handbuch österreichischer Autorinnen und Autoren jüdischer Herkunft 18. bis 20. Jahrhundert. Band 1: A– (Handbook of Austrian authors of Jewish origin from the 18th to the 20th century. Volume 1: A-I). Edited by the Austrian National Library. Saur, Munich 2002, ISBN 3-598-11545-8, p. 369. sources
Warnen und Warten (Warn and wait). In: Franz Richard Reiter (ed.): Our fight. In France for Austria. Interviews with resistance fighters, Documents 7, Vienna (Ephelant, formerly: Böhlau) 1984, pp. 19–40, ISBN 978-3-9007-6602-3.
Individual evidence Jacques Freundlich. In: Werner Röder, Herbert A. Strauss (Hrsg.):  Biographisches Handbuch der deutschsprachigen Emigration nach 1933. Band 1 (Biographical manual of German-speaking emigration after 1933. Volume 1)

1906 births
2001 deaths
20th-century Austrian women writers
Jewish Austrian writers
Translators to German
Articles needing translation from German Wikipedia
English–German translators